Charles Pierce Roland (April 8, 1918 – April 12, 2022) was an American historian and professor emeritus of the University of Kentucky who was known for his research field of the American South and the U.S. Civil War. Roland was a Captain in the United States Army and a World War II veteran. He served as the elected president of the Southern Historical Association and contributed to several other historical societies.

Early life 
Born in the western Tennessee town Maury City on April 8, 1918, Roland grew up as the son and grandson of a family of teachers in Henderson. As a child in the American South, he heard numerous primary accounts of the Civil War from veterans, saying in an interview "There were quite a number of veterans of the Civil War living in that area".

First graduating from Vanderbilt University in 1938, he had studied under poet John Crowe Ransom. He became a high-school history teacher for two years in Alamo, Tennessee, before moving to Washington, D.C., to start work as a historical aide for the National Park Service. Roland would continue in this role until middle of January in 1942 when he was inducted into the United States Armed Forces.

During World War II, he would serve as a Captain in the 99th Infantry Division in the European theatre and was awarded the Purple Heart and Bronze Star over the course of his deployment. He later received his master's degree from George Washington University and then his doctoral degree at Louisiana State University after the war.

Academic career 
Roland has served in several academic capacities throughout his career and has authored a considerable amount of published works on the American Civil War. Around 1959–1960, he was awarded a fellowship from the John Simon Guggenheim Memorial Foundation. In 1981, he was elected president of the Southern Historical Association.

Starting in 1970, following his employment by Tulane University, he became a professor of history emeritus at the University of Kentucky; a position he would hold until he retired in 1988. That same year, the University of Kentucky established the Charles P. Roland Fellowship to support university students, according to the institution, pursuing research "...in American history, especially the history of the Civil War, race relations and the American South."

Additionally, he has served as the elected president of the Louisiana Historical Association, the Harold Keith Johnson Visiting Professor of Military History at the United States Army Military History Institute and Army War College, an executive committee member of the Kentucky Historical Society, and the chairman of the Department of the Army Historical Advisory Committee. At various times throughout his career, he also taught and lectured at West Point.

Personal life and death
On January 23, 1948, Roland married Allie Lee Roland. They remained married for 70 years until her death on April 26, 2018, shortly after Roland's 100th birthday. They had three children.

Roland died at his home in Lexington, Kentucky, on April 12, 2022, four days after his 104th birthday.

Bibliography

Books

Articles

Interviews

See also 
 Shiloh National Military Park – near Henderson where Roland grew up.
 List of centenarians (authors, editors, poets and journalists)

References 

1918 births
2022 deaths
20th-century American historians
American male non-fiction writers
21st-century American historians
21st-century American male writers
Academics from Tennessee
American centenarians
Men centenarians
American military historians
George Washington University alumni
Historians of the American Civil War
Historians of the United States
Louisiana State University alumni
Military personnel from Tennessee
People from Crockett County, Tennessee
People from Henderson, Tennessee
United States Army personnel of World War II
United States Army War College faculty
United States Military Academy faculty
University of Kentucky faculty
Vanderbilt University alumni
Writers from Lexington, Kentucky
20th-century American male writers
United States Army officers